Gavin Carragher (born 17 July 1933) is an Australian sprinter. He competed in the men's 100 metres at the 1956 Summer Olympics. At the 1958 British Empire and Commonwealth Games, Carragher also competed for the Scotland.

References

External links
 

1933 births
Living people
Athletes (track and field) at the 1956 Summer Olympics
Athletes (track and field) at the 1958 British Empire and Commonwealth Games
Australian male sprinters
Olympic athletes of Australia
Place of birth missing (living people)
Commonwealth Games competitors for Australia